Reem Al Marzouqi is an Emirati engineer and the first citizen of the UAE to be granted a patent in the United States of America for designing a car that can be driven without hands.

Biography
Al Marzouqi grew up in a “house full of boys” in the United Arab Emirates, which she credits for her exposure and passion for cars. She started university at United Arab Emirates University in 2008 with goals to become an architect. Stating that she was not, nor was she ever an A student,  she graduated, receiving a bachelor's degree in architectural engineering. While studying at UAEU she worked with engineering consultants in Abu Dhabi and Dubai, including Musanada, a buildings construction management and design in facilities management firm. For hands-on engineering, she won second place in Emirates Skills national carpentry competition and she was the only and first female participating. 

Reem received the granted U.S. patent for her original invention, a "Lower Extremity Vehicle Navigation Control System".,  and it has since been granted in Japan. The system uses a steering lever, an acceleration lever and a brake lever which are entirely foot-controlled, allowing people to drive a car without the use of their upper body. The system is the first of its kind, and the UAEU also has patents pending in China and the European Union. It has become one of the remarkable successes of the Takamul program. 

Al Marzouqi was challenged to come up with a patentable idea in a class on ethics at her university – leading her to recall a TV interview on Inside Edition with Jessica Cox, the world's first licensed armless pilot as she mentioned in her interview difficulties of driving cars for long distances using only her feet. When she first approached her professor with her sketches and ideas, he initially dismissed her and told her to focus on her studies rather than inventing. However, upon seeing the sketches, the professor encouraged al Marzouqi to apply for a US Patent. This speaks to her problem-solving mentality - solving real problems instead of mindlessly inventing. 

Reem has since participated in the Expo Science International exhibition. Her invention was included in the British Museum's A History of the World in 100 Objects exhibition, as displayed at Manarat Al Saadiyat, Abu Dhabi, from April–August 2014. It represented the future, and was heralded by Neil MacGregor, Director of the British Museum, as "a brilliant example of human beings striving to find new things." 

Based on Reem's academic achievement and extracurricular activities, she was selected by the Academy of Achievement to participate as 2014 innovation and technology delegate at the 51st Annual International Achievement Summit in San Francisco, California. Al Marzouqi also holds two Guinness World Records, both set in 2014 – largest flag lifted by helium balloons and longest wedding dress. Reem designed both feats and enlisted The Dubai Club for the Disabled to work on the wedding dress to highlight their talents. Al Marzouqi has also featured in the Arabian Business 50 Most Influential Women in the Arab World in 2018 and 100 smartest people in the UAE lists. 

Since graduating college and obtaining the first US Patent of any Emirati, Reem has been working with Abu Dhabi Airports in their efforts to upgrade the Midfield Terminal and transform the airport into a technological leader. 

Al Marzouqi is married with two sons.

See also 
List of Emiratis
Women in the United Arab Emirates
Women in Arab societies

References

Emirati mechanical engineers
United Arab Emirates University alumni
Living people
Emirati inventors
Emirati architects
Emirati women engineers
21st-century women engineers
21st-century inventors
Women inventors
Year of birth missing (living people)